Mount Roosevelt is a mountain in the Green Mountains in the U.S. state of Vermont. Located in the Breadloaf Wilderness of the Green Mountain National Forest, its summit is in the town of Ripton in Addison County. The mountain is named after Theodore Roosevelt, former president of the United States. Mount Roosevelt is one of five peaks in Vermont's Presidential Range.

Drainage basin
Mount Roosevelt stands within the watersheds of Lake Champlain and the Connecticut River. The southeast side of Mount Roosevelt drains into the Clark Brook, thence into the White River, the Connecticut River, and ultimately into Long Island Sound in Connecticut. The north and west sides of Mount Roosevelt drain into the headwaters of the New Haven River, thence into Otter Creek, Lake Champlain, Canada's Richelieu River, the Saint Lawrence River, and ultimately into the Gulf of Saint Lawrence.

Hiking

Multiple side trails provide access to this section of the Long Trail. The Clark Brook Trail, whose trailhead is in the town of Granville, intersects the Long Trail after .

A popular loop hike begins at the Cooley Glen Trailhead (or the Emily Proctor Trailhead in a counterclockwise direction). The  loop hike takes in three peaks of the Presidential Range: Mount Cleveland, Mount Roosevelt, and Mount Wilson.

References

Mountains of Vermont
Ripton, Vermont
Mountains of Addison County, Vermont